The discography of American singer-songwriter Cat Power consists of eleven studio albums, four EPs, eleven commercial singles, twelve promotional singles, two singles as a featured artist, and numerous music videos.

Albums

EPs

Singles

Promotional singles

As featured artist

Collaborations and guest appearances
 "Pocketful of Sugar", "Pretty Spoiled", "Numbness & Tingling" and "Teenage Boyfriend" on Puss 02 by God Is My Co-Pilot (1995, Dark Beloved Cloud/The Making of Americans) 
 "Sad, Sad Song" on Transfiguration of Vincent by M. Ward (2003, Merge Records)
 "Haiku Ten" on Sixteen Haiku & Other Stories by Sigmatropic (2003, Thirsty Ear Recordings)
 "My Hoo Haa" on Still Lookin' Good to Me by The Band of Blacky Ranchette (2003, Thrill Jockey)
 "I've Been Thinking" on White People by Handsome Boy Modeling School (2004, Elektra)
 "Do the Romp"  on Sunday Nights: The Songs of Junior Kimbrough (2005, Fat Possum Records)
 "Great Waves" on Cinder by Dirty Three (2005, Touch and Go Records)
 "I Love You (Me Either)"  on Monsieur Gainsbourg Revisited (2006, Barclay Records/Virgin)
 "Disown, Delete" on Ensemble's self-titled album (2006, Fat Cat Records)
 "A Kind of Peace" on To All New Arrivals by Faithless (2006, Cheeky Records/Columbia)
 "Revelations" on Yes, I'm a Witch by Yoko Ono (2007, Apple Records/Astralwerks)
 "Poisenville Kids No Wins / Reprise (This Must Be Our Time)" on I'll Sleep When You're Dead by El-P (2007, Definitive Jux)
 "Orphans" and "Walls" on Modern Guilt by Beck (2008, Interscope)
 "Hold On, Hold On" on Easy Come, Easy Go by Marianne Faithfull (2008, Naïve Records)
 "Coming Through" on Nobody Knows. by Willis Earl Beal (2013, Hot Charity)
 "A Little Help" on The Westerner by John Doe (2016, Cool Rock)

Soundtrack appearances
 "Metal Heart" from Moon Pix was featured on the soundtrack Desert Blue: Music from the Motion Picture (1999, Razor & Tie)
 "Naked, If I Want To" from The Covers Record was featured on Jackpot: Original Soundtrack Album (2001, Milan Records)
 "Paths of Victory" from The Covers Record was featured on Music from the Motion Picture North Country (2005, Sony Music)
 "Cross Bones Style" from Moon Pix was featured on Jim White Presents: Music from Searching For the Wrong-Eyed Jesus (2005, Luaka Bop)
 "I Found a Reason" from The Covers Record was featured on V for Vendetta: Music from the Motion Picture (2006, Astralwerks)
 "Sea of Love" from The Covers Record was featured on Juno: Music from the Motion Picture (2007, Rhino Entertainment)
 "It's Alright to Fail"  appeared on The Hottest State: Music from the Motion Picture (2007, Hickory Records)
 "Stuck Inside of Mobile with the Memphis Blues Again" appeared on I'm Not There: Original Soundtrack (2007, Columbia)
 Exclusive song "Anthem" appeared in the 2015 short film Skateboarding in Pine Ridge.

Miscellaneous
 Album versions of "Nude As The News" and "Back of Your Head" appeared on the 1997 compilation What's Up Matador
 A live version of "We Dance" appeared on the 1999 Kill Rock Stars compilation Drinking from Puddles: A Radio History
 The songs "Cross Bones Style" and "Sea of Love", and music videos for "Cross Bones Style" and "Nude as the News", featured on the 1999 compilation Everything Is Nice - The Matador Records 10th Anniversary Anthology
 Samples of "In This Hole", "Fate of the Human Carbine" and "American Flag" were incorporated into "Archive Fever" by Matmos; a sample of "Back of Your Head" featured on the "Matador Megamix" created by DJ Eclipse, both of which were released on This CD Is Not Nice (1999, Matador Records)
 The Covers Record out-take "Come On in My Kitchen" (Robert Johnson) appeared on All Tomorrow's Parties 1.1: Sonic Youth Curated (2001, ATP Recordings)
 Live versions of "Good Woman" (as "To Be A Good Woman") and "Troubled Waters" (recorded for Sydney radio station 2SER) appeared on Live & Direct (2001, Spunk)
 You Are Free out-take "The Party" appeared on 2003's Comes with a Smile Vol. 8 - Like Others Need Oxygen and 2004's Matador at Fifteen
 The song "Cross Bones Style" was featured on the podcast "In Plain Sight: Lady Bird Johnson" from ABC News (2021)

Videos

DVDs
Speaking for Trees (2004)

Films
Speaking for Trees: A Film by Mark Borthwick (2004, Mark Borthwick)
In addition, she appears in two documentary films: The Fearless Freaks (2005, Bradley Beesley) and Two Headed Cow (2006, Tony Gayton); a video installation: Sleepwalkers (2007, Doug Aitken); and two feature films My Blueberry Nights (2007, Wong Kar-wai) and American Widow (2008, C.S. Leigh).

Music videos
"Nude As The News" (1997, Brett Vapnek)
"Cross Bones Style" (1998, Brett Vapnek)
"He War" (2003, Brett Vapnek)
"From Fur City" (2003, Jem Cohen)
"Maybe Not" (2004, Mark Borthwick)
"Free" (2004, Mark Borthwick)
"Half of You" (2004, Mark Borthwick)
 w/ Dirty Three - "Great Waves" (2005, Braden King)
"Maybe Not" (2005, Oliver Pietsch) (spec)
"Living Proof" (2006, Harmony Korine)
"Lived in Bars" (2006, Robert Gordon)
 w/ Ensemble - "Disown, Delete" (2006, Karina Garcia Casanova)
"Where Is My Love?" (version 1) (2006, Anne-Laure Keib)
"Where Is My Love?" (version 2) (2007, Josh & Xander)

Television
Austin City Limits, December 30, 2006
"The Greatest"
"Living Proof"
"Lived in Bars"
"Could We"
"I Don't Blame You"
"Cross Bones Style"
"(I Can't Get No) Satisfaction"
"Morning Surprise", De Beers commercial, 2006 Christmas
"How Can I Tell You" (Adapted cover of Cat Stevens song; not formally released as a single since only 30 seconds were recorded specifically for the commercial)
Rescue Me 5x13
Unforgettable
"New York"

Songs used in movies
"Maybe Not"
The Quiet (2005, Jamie Babbit); "Everything Is Fine (Tout est parfait)" (2008, Yves Christian Fournier)
"Naked, If I Want To" (Jerry A. Miller Jr.)
Jackpot (2001, Michael Polish) (as "Naked If I Want To Be")
"Metal Heart"
Desert Blue (1998, Morgan J. Freeman)
"Rockets"
Trance (1998, Michael Almereyda)
"I Found a Reason" (Lou Reed)
Habibti min elskede (2002, Pernille Fischer Christensen); The Secret Lives of Dentists (2002, Alan Rudolph); Saving Face (2004, Alice Wu); Dandelion (2004, Mark Milgard); V for Vendetta (2005, James McTeigue)
"Sea of Love" (John Phillip Baptiste & George Khoury)
Subrosa (2000, Helen Lee); Juno (2007, Jason Reitman)
"In This Hole"
New Rose Hotel (1998, Abel Ferrara); Under Heaven (1998, Meg Richman); Jackpot (2001, Michael Polish)
"Paths of Victory" (Bob Dylan)
North Country (2005, Niki Caro)
"Cross Bones Style"
Searching For The Wrong-Eyed Jesus (2005, Andrew Douglas)
"Nude as the News"
Winter Passing (2005, Adam Rapp)
"Troubled Waters" (Sam Coslow & Arthur Johnston)
Perfect Stranger (2007, James Foley); "Everything Is Fine (Tout est parfait)" (2008, Yves Christian Fournier)
"The Greatest"
My Blueberry Nights (2007); 17 Again  (2009); Mammoth (2009); "The Family (2013 film)"
"Living Proof"
My Blueberry Nights (2007)
"Werewolf"
Powder Blue (2009, Timothy Linh Bui); Los abrazos rotos (2009, Pedro Almodóvar)
Unknown which song(s)
Vern (2004, Suzi Yoonessi)

Notes

References

Discographies of American artists
Folk music discographies
Rock music group discographies
Pop music group discographies